George Walther may refer to:
 George Walther Sr. (1876–1961), American inventor, engineer and businessman
 George H. Walther (1828–1895), American politician and soldier

See also
George Walter (1928–2008), Antiguan politician